Mount Uritorco is a mountain surmounting the southern part of Telefon Ridge on Deception Island in the South Shetland Islands. The name appears on an Argentine chart of 1956.

Uritorco, Mount
Geography of Deception Island